A.M. Mahbub Uddin Khokon (born 12 January 1956) is a Bangladesh Nationalist Party politician and a former member of parliament from Noakhali-1 constituency.

Career
Mahbub Uddin Khokon was elected to parliament from Noakhali-1 as a Bangladesh Nationalist Party candidate in 2008. He is also the party chief Khaleda Zia's lawyer. He is the founder and leader of the law firm 'Mahbub & Company' based in Dhaka. On 15 December 2018, he was wounded by six bullets fired by the Sonaimuri police under Bangladesh Awami League government during his election campaign for the upcoming general election.

References

1956 births
Living people
Bangladesh Nationalist Party politicians
9th Jatiya Sangsad members